Blenniella chrysospilos, the red-spotted blenny, is a species of combtooth blenny found in coral reefs in the Pacific and Indian oceans.

References

chrysospilos
Fish described in 1857